George Truelove (born 22 September 1975) is an English former professional rugby union and rugby league footballer.

Background
Truelove was born in Newcastle upon Tyne, Tyne and Wear, England.

Career

References

External links
 (archived by web.archive.org) Statistics at premiershiprugby.com
National League 1 Preview
 (archived by web.archive.org) Statistics at lequipe.fr
Saints in seventh heaven
Broncos hoping to buck trend
Broncos overcome by Wolves
Ulster stem Coventry comeback
Frew signs for Wildcats
Leeds on top form
Warriors tame Wildcats
Search for "George Truelove" at bbc.co.uk

1975 births
Living people
Ballymena R.F.C. players
Bedford Blues players
Coventry R.F.C. players
English rugby league players
English rugby union players
London Broncos players
Rugby league players from Tyne and Wear
Rugby league wingers
Rugby union wings
Rugby union players from Newcastle upon Tyne
Wakefield Trinity players